The Staib LB-4 a.k.a. Staib Airyplane is a homebuilt aircraft design of Wilbur Staib.

Design and development
Wilbur Staib (1914–1993) was a self-taught aircraft designer from Diamond, Missouri. Staib served as a flight instructor during the Second World War at Chanute, Kansas flying PT-14s. Staib designed and built five different "LB" (Little Bastard) aircraft and a helicopter, of which several had the title "world's smallest" at their time of construction. Staib flew his aircraft in airshows with the title "The Diamond Wizard".

The LB-4 is a high-wing, uncovered welded steel tube fuselage, single seat twin-engine tricycle gear aircraft. It was registered by the FAA in 1966, and was considered at the time to be the world's smallest twin engine aircraft. The wing ribs were a shortened pattern from a Piper Cub, assembled with staples. The tail is section is mounted on a wire braced removable boom for storage. Fuel tanks are made from  paint-thinner cans. The engines recoil starters.

Operational history
The LB-4 was test flown in 1966 at Carthage, Missouri. Later configurations included a third  engine mounted on top of the wing in pusher configuration.

Specifications (Staib LB-1)

See also

References

Homebuilt aircraft
High-wing aircraft
Single-engined tractor aircraft
Aircraft first flown in 1966